Noughts & Crosses is an alternative name for the game Tic-tac-toe

Noughts & Crosses may also refer to:

Noughts & Crosses (novel series), by Malorie Blackman
Noughts and Crosses (game show), Australian television game show
Noughts + Crosses, British television adaptation of the Malorie Blackman novel.

See also
Knots and Crosses, crime novel by Ian Rankin
Knots and Crosses (Rebus),  2007 episode of STV's Rebus television series